RightScale was a company that sold software as a service for cloud computing management for multiple providers. The company was based in Santa Barbara, California. It was acquired by Flexera Software in 2018.

History 
Thorsten von Eicken, a former professor of computer science at Cornell University, left to manage systems architecture for Expertcity, the startup company that became Citrix Online. He was joined by RightScale CEO Michael Crandell, and RightScale Vice President of Engineering Rafael H. Saavedra.

RightScale received $4.5 million in venture capital in April 2008, $13 million in December 2008, and $25 million in September 2010 at a valuation of $100-$125 million.

On July 18, 2012, RightScale announced its acquisition of the Scotland-based PlanForCloud.com (formerly ShopForCloud.com), which provides a free cloud cost forecasting service.

RightScale introduced the Cloud Maturity Model with the release of its second annual State of the Cloud Report on April 25, 2013. The report findings are based on a RightScale survey of 625 IT decision makers and categorized according to the Cloud Maturity Model, which is an analysis and segmentation of companies based on their varying degrees of cloud adoption.

On September 26, 2018, Flexera Software acquired RightScale for an undisclosed amount.

Partnerships  
On November 5, 2012, RightScale announced it was expanding its existing relationship with cloud hosting provider Rackspace to integrate with OpenStack.

In February 2013, RightScale became the first cloud management company to resell Google Compute Engine public cloud services.

References

Notes

External links 
 Official site

Cloud applications
Cloud infrastructure
Cloud computing providers
Companies established in 2006
Companies based in Santa Barbara County, California